Calanus sinicus is a copepod found in the northwest Pacific.

Description
For adults and copepodite stages IV and above, lower temperatures result in longer prosomes.

Distribution
C. sinicus is found in the northwest Pacific, off of the east coast of Asia to the South China Sea.

Ecology

Life cycle and reproduction
C. sinicus reproduces throughout the year. There are generally two peaks in reproduction. In the southern Yellow Sea, these peaks occur from May to July and from November to January. It is likely that there are two different reproductive strategies carried out during spring and autumn. In the first reproductive period, during spring, the average prosome length is high, which allows it to produce more eggs around the time of the phytoplankton bloom. During autumn, on the other hand, accumulated energy is likely used to finance reproduction. Spawning occurs at the surface during the night and dawn, with peak spawning occurring during the latter. The depth at which eggs are found may be related to the avoidance of cannibalism by late copepodite stages and adults, as, in some cases, a lack of overlap between the vertical distribution of eggs and potential cannibals has been observed. The eggs hatch into nauplii in about one day.

From August onwards, the population declines and its distribution shrinks. During this time, it is found in cooler waters; it oversummers, for example, in the Yellow Sea Cold Bottom Water, where temperatures are usually below . During this time, it still feeds actively.

Relationship with humans
C. sinicus is an important food of anchovies, sandeels, and sardines, which are important commercially.

References

Calanoida
Crustaceans described in 1962